The 2002 FIA GT Silverstone 500 km was the second round the 2002 FIA GT Championship season.  It took place at the Silverstone Circuit, United Kingdom, on 5 May 2002.

Official results
Class winners in bold.  Cars failing to complete 70% of winner's distance marked as Not Classified (NC).

† – #63 System Force Motorsport was disqualified from the race for failing to respond to a black flag.

Statistics
 Pole position – #14 Lister Storm Racing – 1:46.644
 Fastest lap – #14 Lister Storm Racing – 1:47.430
 Average speed – 162.530 km/h

References

 
 
 

S
Silverstone
May 2002 sports events in the United Kingdom